Tovohery Rabenandrasana (born 12 November 1987) is a Malagasy footballer currently plays for Academie Ny Antsika, he played formerly on loan for AA Antsirabe.

External links
 

1987 births
Living people
Malagasy footballers
Madagascar international footballers
Association football fullbacks
Academie Ny Antsika players